The Indiana State Teachers’ Retirement Fund (TRF) was created by the Indiana General Assembly in 1921. Today, TRF manages and distributes the retirement benefit of educators in all public schools, as well as some charter schools and universities, throughout Indiana. Headed by a governor-appointed executive director, as well as a six-member Board of Trustees, TRF aims to prudently manage the Fund in accordance with fiduciary standards, provide quality benefits, and deliver a high level of service to TRF members while demonstrating responsibility to citizens of the State.

Members 
All legally qualified teachers who are regularly employed in the public school system of Indiana or in qualified positions at certain state institutions, as well as all TRF employees, must be members of TRF. Some legally-qualified state employees and employers are eligible for optional enrollment. A legally qualified substitute teacher may be a member of TRF upon completion of one year of service (defined as 120 days in one fiscal year or 60 days in each of any two fiscal years).

As of June 30, 2008, TRF had over 150,000 active, inactive, and retired members and beneficiaries and managed approximately 8.6 billion dollars in assets.

Benefit 
The TRF benefit consists of two parts: the monthly pension benefit and the Annuity Savings Account (ASA).

The monthly pension benefit is determined by salary history, years of service, age, and the retirement option selected. TRF members become vested in the pension benefit after 10 years of qualified Indiana service. Members may purchase service credit for military service, out-of-state teaching, and qualified leaves of absence.

The Annuity Savings Account (ASA) is made up of voluntary and mandatory contributions, as well as investment earnings, and is figured on the balance at the time of retirement and the payment option selected. TRF members allocate their ASA contributions among different investment options offered by TRF, each with a specified level of risk.

A TRF member may also create a Rollover Savings Account by transferring funds from an individual retirement account (IRA) or other Qualified Retirement Plan into TRF.

Retirement
Planning for RetirementTRF offers one-on-one benefit appointments where members can meet with a benefit specialist to review a benefit estimate and ask any questions about the retirement process. Although any member is welcome to schedule an appointment, it is especially encouraged for those who are within two years of retirement. Appointments may be held in our Indianapolis office or over the phone.

Payment OptionsWhen members retire, they must select one of the six alternatives for the distribution of the monthly pension benefit portion of their retirement. Members may also choose to select the Social Security Integration option with any of the six listed options.

When members retire, they must select one of the seven options for the distribution of their ASA.

Minimum Amount ProvisionThe minimum amount provision is relevant to certain monthly pension benefit and ASA distribution options. The minimum amount provision is in place to guarantee that a member or that member's beneficiary will receive benefit payments that total at least the balance of the member's Annuity Savings Account (ASA) at the time of retirement. If a member does not receive this minimum amount in combined annuity and pension payments during his or her lifetime, the member's beneficiary can claim the remaining amount due. For example, if a member has $100,000 in her ASA at the time of retirement, this member's total benefits (combined annuity and pension payments) must equal $100,000 or the member's beneficiary may claim the difference.

Disability RetirementIf a member with five or more years of service in a TRF-covered position becomes disabled while an active teacher, the member may be eligible for a classroom or retirement disability benefit.

Age 70 BenefitsA member who is age 70 or older with 20 or more years of service may continue to receive pension payments and continue to be employed in a covered position. In this situation, there is no required separation from service period and no earnings limitation. For any TRF member who continues employment while receiving monthly pension benefits, no employer share contributions are made to TRF and no supplemental pension is earned.

References 

Organizations based in Indiana